The 2015–16 Northern Ireland Football League Cup (known as the JBE League Cup for sponsorship purposes) was the 30th edition of Northern Ireland's football knock-out cup competition for national league clubs, and the third edition of the competition as the Northern Ireland Football League Cup. This season's League Cup was sponsored by JBE Mechanical Electrical, and was contested by the 40 clubs in the NIFL Premiership, NIFL Championship 1 and NIFL Championship 2. The number of participants fell by one this season following Ballymoney United's relegation from the 2014–15 NIFL Championship 2 to regional football. The competition began on 18 August 2015 with the first round, and concluded on 13 February 2016 with the final at Solitude.

For the third consecutive season Cliftonville were the defending champions, following their 3–2 win over Ballymena United in the 2015 final. This secured the trophy for the third consecutive season and the fourth time overall. This season they once again pulled off a successful defence of the Cup, defeating second-tier side Ards 3–0 in the final. In doing so, they became the first club ever to appear in, and win four consecutive League Cup finals. Ards reached the final for the first time in 21 years, and the third time overall. This marked only the second occasion in the competition's history that a club from outside the top flight had reached the final, the first being Portadown (then of the second tier) in the 2009 final. Ards' previous final appearance had also been against Cliftonville, when they won the Cup 2–0 on penalties after a 0–0 draw in 1994–95.

Format and schedule
The competition was played in a straight knock-out format and was open to the 40 members of the NIFL Premiership, NIFL Championship 1 and NIFL Championship 2. The top 16 ranked clubs from last season received byes into the second round, which included the 12 members of the 2014–15 NIFL Premiership and the top four ranked clubs from the 2014–15 NIFL Championship. Of the remaining 24 Championship clubs, 16 of them entered the competition in the first round, with the other eight given byes into the second round. Replays were not used in the competition, with all matches using extra time and penalties to determine the winner if necessary.

Results
The league tier of each club at the time of entering the competition is listed in parentheses.

First round
The draw for the first round was made randomly and included 24 of the 28 NIFL Championship clubs, with the top four ranked clubs from the 2014–15 NIFL Championship not entering until the second round. 8 of the 24 Championship clubs received a bye into the second round, leaving the remaining 16 Championship clubs in the first round to play a total of eight ties. The draw took place on 6 August 2015, with the matches played on 18 August 2015. The eight clubs to receive byes were: Annagh United, Dergview, Dollingstown, Dundela, Limavady United, Lisburn Distillery, Lurgan Celtic and PSNI.

|}

Second round
The second round draw was made on 22 August 2015, with the matches played on 1, 2 and 15 September 2015. The second round draw was made up of the remaining 32 clubs, with a seeding system in place for this round only. The 16 highest-ranked clubs from the 2014–15 league season were seeded, including the 12 members of the 2014–15 NIFL Premiership along with the top four clubs from the 2014–15 NIFL Championship. The eight winners from the first round matches and the eight clubs that received byes into the second round were unseeded.

|-
|colspan="3" style="background:#E8FFD8;"|1 September 2015

|-
|colspan="3" style="background:#E8FFD8;"|2 September 2015

|-
|colspan="3" style="background:#E8FFD8;"|15 September 2015

|}

Third round
The 16 winners from the second round matches entered this round. With no seeding, the third round fixtures were determined by a random draw, and took place on 14 October 2015. Limavady United were the lowest-ranked club to reach the third round, as the last remaining representative from the third tier.

Quarter-finals
The 8 winners from the third round matches entered the quarter-finals. As the only two clubs from outside the top-flight to reach the quarter-finals, the two second-tier sides – Ards and Institute – were the lowest-ranked sides remaining in the competition.

Semi-finals
The 4 quarter-final winners entered this round. The semi-final draw took place on 21 November 2015, with the matches played on 15 December 2015. As the only club from outside the top-flight to reach the semi-finals, Ards were the lowest-ranked side remaining in the competition at this stage.

Final
The final was played on 13 February 2016 at Solitude. Cliftonville became the first club ever to reach four consecutive League Cup finals, and the first club ever to win four consecutive Cups. Ards became only the second club from outside the top flight to reach the final in the competition's history, and the first since Portadown (who were in the second tier at the time) did so in 2008–09.

See also
 2015–16 NIFL Premiership
 2015–16 NIFL Championship
 2015–16 Irish Cup

External links
NIFL official site

References

Lea
2015–16 European domestic association football cups
2015-16